Iván Martínez Gonzálvez (born 17 August 1998), known as Iván Barbero or simply Barbero, is a Spanish footballer who plays for CA Osasuna B as a forward.

Club career
Born in Roquetas de Mar, Almería, Andalusia, Barbero started his career with AD Parador. He then represented Polideportivo Ejido and AD Polideportivo Aguadulce, making his senior debut with the latter on 21 December 2014 by starting in a 3–0 Segunda Andaluza home win against CD La Cantoriana.

Barbero moved to Club Natación Almería in the 2015 summer, returning to youth football. In the following year he joined UD Almería, being initially assigned to the Juvenil A squad; he also represented the reserves in Tercera División during the campaign.

On 17 June 2017, Barbero signed for another reserve team, CA Osasuna B in Segunda División B. On 27 June 2019, after helping the B-team in their promotion back to the third division with 19 goals, he renewed his contract until 2023.

Barbero made his first team debut on 19 December 2019, starting in a 3–0 away win against CF Lorca Deportiva, for the season's Copa del Rey. The following 30 January, he returned to Almería on loan until the end of the season, with an obligatory € 2 million buyout clause in case of promotion. 

Barbero made his professional debut on 2 February 2020, coming on as a late substitute for Radosav Petrović in a 1–1 away draw against CD Numancia. On 28 August, he moved to fellow second division side AD Alcorcón also in a temporary deal.

Upon returning, Barbero was assigned to the first team of Osasuna, and made his La Liga debut on 29 August 2021 by playing the last three minutes in a 3–2 away win over Cádiz CF. On 1 September 2022, after featuring rarely, he was demoted to the B-team, now in Primera Federación.

Personal life
Barbero's father, also known as Barbero, was also a footballer. A goalkeeper, he also represented Almería.

Career statistics

Club

References

External links
 
 

1998 births
Living people
Footballers from Andalusia
Sportspeople from the Province of Almería
Spanish footballers
Association football forwards
La Liga players
Segunda División players
Segunda División B players
Tercera División players
Divisiones Regionales de Fútbol players
UD Almería B players
CA Osasuna B players
CA Osasuna players
UD Almería players
AD Alcorcón footballers